The position of the head of the Republic of North Ossetia–Alania (formerly known as the President of the Republic of North Ossetia–Alania) is the highest office within the Government of North Ossetia–Alania in Russia. The head is elected by citizens of Russia residing in the republic. The term of service is five years.

List

Timeline

Notes

References

External links
 Russian republics

 
North Ossetia–Alania
Politics of North Ossetia–Alania